The Oswego and Syracuse Railroad was formed April 29, 1839, and the route was surveyed during the summer of that year. The Company was fully organized March 25, 1847. In 1872 it passed under the management of the Delaware, Lackawanna and Western Railroad.

History

One of the oldest surviving railroad structures in New York State is the 1848 freighthouse of the Oswego and Syracuse Railroad in Oswego, New York. It is situated along West Utica Street, approximately one block west of the site of the former Delaware, Lackawanna and Western Railroad (DL&WRR) depot.

For many years, the DL&WRR maintained offices in Old City Hall in village of Oswego built in 1836 to rival the Market House in Albany. It is a three story brick structure. The third floor was wide open and used to provide drill space for the local militia during the winter months. The city built a new building a few blocks south in 1871.

By 1862, the passenger depot in Syracuse was located at the New York Central Railroad passenger depot where the baggage master was Arthur Hughes. The freight house was located West of New York Central Freight Houses in the 5th Ward. Freight agent was P. Bassett and tallyman was James Murray.

The railroad had stations in Syracuse, Baldwinsville, Lamsons, South Granby, Fulton, Minetto and Oswego.

Freight rail

An act was passed by the New York State Legislature during their assembly in 1847 which allowed the Oswego and Syracuse Railroad Company to carry freight provided they paid tolls to New York State.

Company management

In 1862, F. T. Carrington from Oswego was president and Allen Monroe from Syracuse was vice-president. Secretary was A. P. Grant and treasurer was Luther Wright, both from Oswego, along with George Skinner who was superintendent.

Directors of the company in 1862 included; F. T. Carrington, Luther Wright, A. P. Grant, J. Turrill, S. Doolittle, all of Oswego. Additionally, E. B. Judson, Allen Monroe, E. R. Wicks, T. T. Davis of Syracuse and R. H. King and H. H. Martin, both from Albany and M. Islam of New York City.

Syracuse, Binghamton and New York railroad

The Oswego and Syracuse Railroad consolidated with the Syracuse, Binghamton and New York Railroad in 1853 after the act was authorized by the New York State Legislature.

In 1860, the rail was authorized along with New York Central Railroad Company to build a station house in Geddes.

Delaware, Lackawanna and Western railroad

The DL&WRR bought the Syracuse, Binghamton and New York Railroad in 1869 and leased the Oswego and Syracuse Railroad on February 13, 1869. This gave them a branch from Binghamton north and northwest via Syracuse to Oswego, a port on Lake Ontario.

When the DL&WRR took over the Oswego and Syracuse Railroad in 1872, the road acquired the former hall for its shipping offices in the Great Lakes port. They held ownership until 1946.

References

Predecessors of the Delaware, Lackawanna and Western Railroad
Railway companies established in 1839
Railway companies disestablished in 1872
Defunct New York (state) railroads
Defunct railroads in Syracuse, New York
1839 establishments in New York (state)
1872 disestablishments in New York (state)
American companies established in 1839
American companies disestablished in 1872